Charhoi is a tehsil of Kotli District, Azad Kashmir, Pakistan. It is the largest city in Kotli district and is the headquarters of the district subdivision. A shrine of the poet Mian Muhammad Bakhsh is about 5 kilometers away from the main bazaar.  Charhoi has a police station, post office, a grand Jamia masjid, and a basic health unit.  Charhoi Gala is main entrance of Charhoi city. Narakot, Chahwala, Dahmal Bazar, Damas meda town and meda town is creation of a man name called meda he has died now Juna Khanka Kotera, Sanyah are the main places around Charhoi. Charhoi is situated some 50 kilometers away from Mirpur City and around 30 kilometers from Khuiratta. Dahmal Nursery is a lush green place some 5 kilometers away, towards Khuiratta.

Tehsils of Kotli District